"Så skimrande var aldrig havet" is a 1948 love ballad written by Evert Taube. Roxette vocalist Marie Fredriksson recorded a critically acclaimed version for the 1990 tribute album Taube. In 1997, Norwegian singer Elisabeth Andreassen recorded the song as the title track on her album Så skimrande var aldrig havet.

References

1948 songs
Elisabeth Andreassen songs
Songs about oceans and seas
Songs written by Evert Taube